Carlos Eduardo Lecciolle Thomazella (born 18 August 1990), commonly known as Thomazella, is a Brazilian footballer who plays as a goalkeeper for Portuguesa.

Club career

Born in Botucatu, São Paulo, Thomazella was a São Caetano youth graduate. He started to appear in the first team squad in 2010, as a backup, before joining XV de Piracicaba on loan.

After again being a backup option in 2011, Thomazella moved to São José-SP ahead of the 2012 season, but was again a second-choice. He subsequently signed for Série C side Icasa, making his senior debut with the side on 1 July 2012 by starting in a 0–0 away draw against Cuiabá.

In December 2012, Thomazella agreed to a deal with Caldense. Despite being again a backup, he was presented at Guarani on 6 May 2013, where he also featured rarely.

On 11 December 2013, Thomazella signed for Batatais for the upcoming season. After being a regular starter, he moved to Série B side Luverdense in May 2014.

On 22 December 2016, Thomazella joined Rio Claro for the 2017 campaign. A backup option, he spent the entire 2018 without a club, before signing for Santo André on 28 November of that year.

On 5 June 2019, Thomazella was presented at Água Santa. On 6 October of the following year, he moved to Portuguesa, and was a backup to Dheimison as the club won the Copa Paulista.

Thomazella shared the starting spot with Dheimison during the 2021 season at Lusa, and became an undisputed starter in 2022, after Dheimison left for ABC. On 27 May 2022, after winning that year's Campeonato Paulista Série A2, he renewed his contract until 2024.

Career statistics

Honours

Club
Luverdense
Campeonato Mato-Grossense: 2016

Santo André
Campeonato Paulista Série A2: 2019

Portuguesa
Copa Paulista: 2020
Campeonato Paulista Série A2: 2022

Individual
Campeonato Paulista Série A2 Best XI: 2022

References

1990 births
Living people
Footballers from São Paulo (state)
Brazilian footballers
Association football goalkeepers
Campeonato Brasileiro Série B players
Campeonato Brasileiro Série C players
Associação Desportiva São Caetano players
Esporte Clube XV de Novembro (Piracicaba) players
São José Esporte Clube players
Associação Desportiva Recreativa e Cultural Icasa players
Associação Atlética Caldense players
Guarani FC players
Batatais Futebol Clube players
Luverdense Esporte Clube players
Rio Claro Futebol Clube players
Esporte Clube Santo André players
Esporte Clube Água Santa players
Associação Portuguesa de Desportos players
People from Botucatu